The Best of National Lampoon #3 was an American humor book published in 1973. The book was an anthology of articles from National Lampoon magazine. It was sold on newsstands, but was published in parallel with the regular issues of the magazine. The book is a "best-of" compilation of pieces that had already been published in the National Lampoon. The pieces were from various 1971 and 1972 (monthly) issues of the magazine.

The comic book artist Neal Adams drew the cover illustration. Written pieces were by Chris Miller, Gerry Sussman, Michel Choquette, Henry Beard, Sean Kelly, Brian McConnachie, Doug Kenney and many other regular contributors to the magazine. There was artwork by Edward Gorey, Bruce McCall, Rick Meyerowitz, and Gahan Wilson.

Notable articles and features in this issue included "Chums in the Dark", by Henry Beard and Hugo Flesch; "How to Score with Chicks," by Doug Kenney; "How to Make It with Men", by Amy Ephron; "Commie Plot Comics", by Doug Kenney; "Children’s Letters to the Gestapo," by Michael O’Donoghue; "Son-o’-God Comics", by Sean Kelly and Neal Adams; "Would You Buy a Used War from This Man?", by Henry Beard and John Boni; and "The Last, Really, No Shit, Really, The Last Supplement to the Whole Earth Catalog", By Tony Hendra, Michael O’Donoghue, Sean Kelly, and Henry Beard.

References

National Lampoon books
1973 books